Constance of Aragon (1179 – 23 June 1222) was an Aragonese infanta who was by marriage firstly Queen of Hungary, and secondly Queen of Germany and Sicily and Holy Roman Empress. She was regent of Sicily from 1212 to 1220.

She was the second child and eldest daughter of the nine children of Alfonso II of Aragon and Sancha of Castile.

Queen of Hungary
Her father died in 1196 and Constance's fate was decided by the new King, her brother Peter II. Peter arranged her marriage with King Emeric of Hungary, and the nineteen-year-old Constance left Aragon for Hungary. The wedding took place in 1198. Two years later, in 1200, the Queen gave birth to a son, called Ladislaus.

When King Emeric was dying, he crowned his son Ladislaus co-ruler on 26 August 1204. The King wanted to secure his succession and had his brother Andrew promise to protect the child and help him govern the Kingdom of Hungary until reaching adulthood. Emeric died three months later, on 30 November.

Ladislaus succeeded him as King while Andrew became his Regent. Andrew soon took over all regal authority while Ladislaus and Constance were little more than his prisoners. Constance managed to escape to Vienna with Ladislaus.

The two found refuge in the court of Leopold VI, Duke of Austria, but Ladislaus would soon die (7 May 1205). The former Regent and now King Andrew II of Hungary took the body of his nephew and buried him in the Royal Crypt of Székesfehérvár. Duke Leopold sent Constance back to Aragon.

Holy Roman Empress

When Constance returned to Aragon, she took up residence with her mother, Queen Sancha, in the Abbey of Nuestra Senora, at Sijena; Sancha had founded the abbey after her husband's death, and now lived there in retirement. Constance spent the next three years in the abbey with her mother, until her fate, again, was changed by her brother.

Peter II wanted to be on good terms with Pope Innocent III, since he wanted an annulment of his marriage with Maria of Montpellier, and needed the blessing of the Pope. The Pope solicited the hand of the Dowager Queen of Hungary for his pupil, the young King Frederick II, Holy Roman Emperor. The Aragonese King accepted the proposal; Constance left her mother and the abbey of Nuestra Senora and began her trip to Sicily (1208). She never returned to Aragon or saw her mother again. Sancha died shortly after the departure of her daughter.

Constance and Frederick were married in the Sicilian city of Messina on 15 August 1209. In the ceremony, she was crowned Queen of Sicily. By this time, Constance was thirty years old and her new husband only fourteen. Two years later, in 1211, Constance gave birth to a son, called Henry, who later had a tragic end.

On 9 December 1212, Frederick was crowned King of Germany in opposition to Otto IV, Holy Roman Emperor. During the absence of her husband, Constance stayed in Sicily as regent of the Kingdom until 1220.

At first Frederick controlled Southern Germany but Otto IV was effectively deposed on 5 July 1215. This time Constance was crowned German Queen with her husband.

Pope Honorius III crowned Frederick Holy Roman Emperor on 22 November 1220. Constance was crowned Holy Roman Empress while their son Henry became the new King of Germany. She died of malaria less than two years later in Catania and was buried in the Cathedral of Palermo, in a Roman sarcophagus with a beautiful crown, the Crown of Constance.

References

Jacqueline Alio: Queens of Sicily 1061-1266, Trinacria, New York 2018.
Uwe A. Oster: Die Frauen Kaiser Friedrichs II, Piper Verlag, Munich 2008.
Ingo Runde: Konstanze von Aragón, in: Die Kaiserinnen des Mittelalters, hrsg. von Amalie Fößel, Pustet, Regensburg 2011, pp. 232–248.
Austin Lane Poole: Filippo di Svevia e Ottone IV, in: Storia del mondo medievale, vol. V, 1999, pp. 54–93.
E.F. Jacob: Innocenzo III, in: Storia del mondo medievale, vol. V, 1999, pp. 5–53.
Michelangelo Schipa: L'Italia e la Sicilia sotto Federico II, in: Storia del mondo medievale, vol. V, 1999, pp. 153–197.
Maria Amalia Mastelloni: Il sarcofago antico di Costanza d'Aragona, in Federico e la Sicilia, dalla terra alla corona. Arti figurative e arti suntuarie, a cura di M. Andaloro, Palermo 1995, pp. 46–52.

|-

|-

1179 births
1222 deaths
13th-century viceregal rulers
13th-century women rulers
Italian queens consort
Royal consorts of Sicily
German queens consort
12th-century Italian women
13th-century Italian women
Burials at Palermo Cathedral
House of Aragon
Duchesses of Swabia
Aragonese infantas
Wives of Frederick II, Holy Roman Emperor
Remarried royal consorts
Hungarian queens consort
Female regents
Daughters of kings
Queen mothers